Tisserand is a lunar impact crater that is located just to the east of the larger crater Macrobius, to the northwest of the Mare Crisium. The crater was named after French astronomer François Félix Tisserand.

The rim of Tisserand has been eroded by impacts, with depressions in the southern and northeastern sides, and a nearly tangential curving valley cutting into the inner wall along the northwest. The interior floor is relatively level, with low ridges near the eastern and western inner walls. The eastern half of the floor has a slightly lower albedo than the western half, with the latter part being lightly coated by ray material from Proclus to the south.

Satellite craters
By convention these features are identified on lunar maps by placing the letter on the side of the crater midpoint that is closest to Tisserand.

References

External links

 LTO-43C2 Macrobius — L&PI topographic map

Impact craters on the Moon